Wolfgang Gerz (born 8 October 1952) is a German sailor. He competed in the Finn event at the 1984 Summer Olympics.

References

External links
 

1952 births
Living people
German male sailors (sport)
Olympic sailors of West Germany
Sailors at the 1984 Summer Olympics – Finn
Sportspeople from Munich